Nursing in India is the practice of providing care for patients, families, and communities in that nation to improve health and quality of life.

History
There is evidence of institutionalised hospitals and nursing in India going back to the 5th century BC.

Florence Nightingale
Florence Nightingale had a great influence over nursing in India and had a close knowledge of Indian conditions, especially in the army. She was interested in the nursing service for the civilian population, though her first interest was the welfare of the army in India.  

In 1854 (in Crimean war), when women nurses were considered as rare, Florence Nightingale shows her ability in nursing. Works of Florence results in formation of Royal Commission. Army Medical School was established in year 1857. She established "Nightingale School for nurses". In 1907, she gained "The Order of Merit" by the King.
Nursing in india- https://nursinginindia.com/

19th century
In 1871, the first school of nursing was started in Government General Hospital, Madras with a six-month diploma midwives programme with four students. The first nursing school for women was started at Kanpur's Saint Catherine's Hospital by Dr Alice Marval.

Four female superintendents and four trained nurses from England were posted to Madras. Between 1890 and 1900, many schools, under either missions or government, were started in various parts of India. In the 20th century, national nursing associations were started.

In 1897, B. C. Roy worked to the standards of nursing and nurses of both sexes.

Qualifications
The Indian Nursing Council recognises several levels of nurses:
 Auxiliary Nurse & Midwife (R.ANM) - 10+2 years schooling + 2 years training + exam
 General Nursing & Midwifery (RN & RM) - 3 and 1/2 years years + exam or B.Sc (Basic)
 various additional qualifications and specialisations, including postgraduate studies.

See also
 Indian Nursing Council

References

Further reading

External links
  Indian Nursing Council
 Tamil Nadu Nurses and Midwives Council